A megadrile is a kind of worm, a mostly terrestrial oligochaete. Megadriles are placed within the superorder Megadrilacea, and include Moniligastrida and Lumbricina (or the order Haplotaxida, following Easton).

References 

Clitellata
Invertebrate common names